Delyana Vodenicharova (born 19 October 1973) is a Bulgarian gymnast. She competed at the 1988 Summer Olympics and the 1992 Summer Olympics, as well as the 1989 World Championships and 1993 World Championships.

Competitive history

References

External links
 

1973 births
Living people
Bulgarian female artistic gymnasts
Olympic gymnasts of Bulgaria
Gymnasts at the 1988 Summer Olympics
Gymnasts at the 1992 Summer Olympics
Sportspeople from Ruse, Bulgaria